Three submarines of the French Navy have borne the name Espadon (meaning Swordfish):

 , a  launched in 1901 and stricken in 1919
 , a  launched in 1926 and scuttled in 1943
 , a  launched in 1958 and preserved as a museum ship in 1987

French Navy ship names